The 23rd Annual GMA Dove Awards were held on April 9, 1992, recognizing accomplishments of musicians for the year 1991. The show was held in Nashville, Tennessee, and was hosted by Marilyn McCoo and Glen Campbell.

Award recipients

Artists
Artist of the Year
Amy Grant
New Artist of the Year
Michael English
Male Vocalist of the Year
Michael English
Female Vocalist of the Year
Sandi Patti
Group of the Year
BeBe & CeCe Winans
Songwriter of the Year
Steven Curtis Chapman

Songs
Song of the Year
"Place in this World"; Michael W. Smith, Amy Grant, Wayne Kirkpatrick; O'Ryan Music, Age to Age Music, Emily Boothe (ASCAP/BMI)
Rap/Hip Hop Recorded Song of the Year
"I Love Rap Music"; Nu Thang; dc Talk
Rock Recorded Song of the Year
"Simple House"; Simple House; Margaret Becker
Pop/Contemporary Recorded Song of the Year
"Home Free"; Home Free; Wayne Watson
Hard Music Song of the Year
"Everybody Knows My Name"; Kinetic Faith; Bride
Southern Gospel Recorded Song of the Year
"Where Shadows Never Fall"; Show Me Your Way; Glen Campbell
Inspirational Recorded Song of the Year
"For All The World"; Another Time...Another Place; Sandi Patti
Country Recorded Song of the Year
"Sometimes Miracles Hide"; Sometimes Miracles Hide Bruce Carroll
Traditional Gospel Recorded Song of the Year
"Through the Storm"; Through the Storm; Yolanda Adams
Contemporary Gospel Recorded Song of the Year
"Addictive Love"; Different Lifestyles; BeBe & CeCe Winans

Albums
Rap/Hip Hop Album of the Year
Mike-E and the G-Rap Crew; Mike-E
Rock Album of the Year
Simple House; Margaret Becker
Pop/Contemporary Album of the Year
For the Sake of the Call; Steven Curtis Chapman
Hard Music Album of the Year
In the Kingdom; Whitecross
Southern Gospel Album of the Year
Homecoming; Gaither Vocal Band
Inspirational Album of the Year
Larnelle LIVE...Psalms, Hymns & Spiritual Songs; Larnelle Harris
Country Album of the Year
Sometimes Miracles Hide; Bruce Carroll
Traditional Gospel Album of the Year
For The Rest of My Life; Mom & Pop Winans
Contemporary Gospel Album of the Year
He Is Christmas; Take 6
Instrumental Album of the Year
Beyond Nature; Phil Keaggy
Praise & Worship Album of the Year
Sanctuary; Twila Paris
Children's Music Album of the Year
The Friendship Company: Open for Business; Sandi Patti
Musical Album of the Year
The Big Picture; Michael W. Smith; Andy Stanley, Robert Sterling; Word
Choral Collection Album of the Year
The Michael W. Smith Collection; Robert Sterling, Dennis Worley; Word
Recorded Music Packaging of the Year
Buddy Jackson, Mark Tucker, Beth Middleworth; Brave Heart; Kim Hill

Videos
Short Form Music Video of the Year
"Another Time, Another Place"; Sandi Patti, Wayne Watson; Stephen Yake
Long Form Music Video of the Year
Rap, Rock & Soul; dc Talk; Deaton-Flanigen; Deaton-Flanigen

External links
 https://doveawards.com/awards/past-winners/

GMA
1992 in American music
1992 in Tennessee
1992 music awards
GMA Dove Awards